Isfara Airport is an airport serving Isfara, a city in the Sughd province in northern Tajikistan.

Facilities

References

Airports in Tajikistan
Sughd Region